Pulau Sarimbun (previously also spelled Pulau Serimbun or Pulau Srimbun) is a small island situated in the Straits of Johor, off the north-western coast of Singapore. Located within Singapore waters, it has an area of 1.4 hectare.

William Arthur Bates Goodall was a regular visitor in the 1920s and subsequently lived there permanently in the 1930s until his death in 1941.

References

Islands of Singapore